The 863 program or State High-Tech Development Plan was a program funded and administered by the government of the People's Republic of China intended to stimulate the development of advanced technologies in a wide range of fields for the purpose of rendering China independent of financial obligations for foreign technologies. It was inspired by the Strategic Defense Initiative proposed by U.S. President Ronald Reagan in 1983, and was ended in 2016.

On March 3, 1986, the program was suggested by Wang Daheng, Wang Ganchang, Yang Jiachi, and Chen Fangyun in a letter to China's paramount leader Deng Xiaoping, who approved the program within 2 days. The program was initially led by Zhao Ziyang, who was the Premier of China at the time, and received a governmental fund of 10 billion RMB in 1986, which accounts for 5% of the total government spending that year.

Among the products known to have resulted from the 863 program are the Loongson computer processor family (originally named  Godson), the Tianhe supercomputers and the Shenzhou spacecraft.

History

Named after its date of establishment (March 1986, 86/3 by the Chinese date format), the 863 Program was proposed in a letter to the Chinese government by scientists Wang Daheng, Wang Ganchang, Yang Jiachi, and Chen Fangyun and endorsed by Deng Xiaoping. After its implementation during the Seventh Five-Year Plan, the program continued to operate through the two five-year plans that followed, with state financing of around 11 billion RMB and an output of around 2000 patents (national and international).

Under the plan, about US$200 billion was to be spent on information and communication technologies, of which US$150 billion was earmarked for telecommunications.
In 1996 the key technological field of Marine Technology was added.
The implementation took place during the Seventh Five-Year Plan and an update has been made during the period of the Tenth, which lasted from 2001 to 2005.

In 2001, under the Tenth Five-Year Plan, the program was reevaluated in consultation with foreign experts. The result was a widened focus to strengthen the competitiveness of China in the global economy. The evaluation practice has been included into the program as a project management system.

In a 2011 court case, Chinese-born scientist Huang Kexue was found guilty of stealing commercial secrets from US-based corporations and passing at least some of this information to the 863 program.

Outline
The program initially focused on seven key technological fields:
 Biotechnology
 Space
 Information technology
 Laser technology
 Automation
 Energy
 New materials
Since 1986, two more fields have been brought under the umbrella of the program:
 Telecommunications (1992)
 Marine technology (1996)

See also 

 Science and technology in China
 Program 973
 State Key Laboratories
 Project 985
 Project 211

References

External links
The 863 program description by the Ministry of Science & Technology of the People's Republic of China

Science and technology in the People's Republic of China